This article is about the particular significance of the year 1947 to Wales and its people.

Incumbents

Archbishop of Wales – David Prosser, Bishop of St David's
Archdruid of the National Eisteddfod of Wales
Crwys (outgoing)
Wil Ifan (incoming)

Events
1 January - Nationalisation of the coal mining industry under the new National Coal Board.
1 March - Opening of Ysgol Gymraeg Dewi Sant, Llanelli, the first Welsh-medium school.
15 March - Cambrian Slate Quarry at Glyn Ceiriog formally notifies closure.
2-3 April - A British ship, the 1,580 ton Stancliffe, runs aground off Sharpness loaded with 3,000 tons of timber. Local shipyard engineer, Ivor Langford, manages to cut the vessel in two and sail both parts down to Cardiff Docks.
23 April - Wreck of the Samtampa on Sker rocks and loss of the Mumbles life-boat, Edward, Prince of Wales.
11 July - Ifan ab Owen Edwards is knighted.
September - Cardiff Castle is donated by the Marquess of Bute to the city of Cardiff.
12 November - Chancellor of the Exchequer Hugh Dalton inadvertently reveals some of the contents of his Budget while on his way to the House of Commons to deliver his speech, effectively finishing his political career.
13 December - Royal Naval Air Station Dale, Pembrokeshire, closes.
Founded in this year are:
Age Concern Cymru.
BBC Welsh Chorus.
Steel Company of Wales.
Wales Gas Board.
Sir Frederick John Alban becomes President of the Society of Incorporated Accountants and Chairman of the Welsh Hospitals Board.
David Brynmor Anthony is awarded the Médaille de Vermeil de la Reconnaissance Française by the government of France.

Arts and literature
June 11–15 - First Llangollen International Musical Eisteddfod is held.
First Cerdd Dant festival is held.
Caradog Prichard begins writing for The Daily Telegraph.

Awards
National Eisteddfod of Wales (held in Colwyn Bay)
National Eisteddfod of Wales: Chair - John Tudor Jones (John Eilian), "Maelgwn Gwynedd"
National Eisteddfod of Wales: Crown - Griffith John Roberts, "Glyn y Groes"
National Eisteddfod of Wales: Prose Medal - withheld

New books

English language
William Ewart Berry - British Newspapers and their Controllers
Jack Jones - Off to Philadelphia in the Morning
Michael Gareth Llewelyn - White Wheat
John Cowper Powys – Obstinate Cymric
Sir James Frederick Rees - Studies in Welsh history

Welsh language
J. Eirian Davies - Awen y Wawr
William Jones - Adar Rhiannon a Cherddi Eraill
Elizabeth Watkin-Jones - Y Cwlwm Cêl and Y Dryslwyn

Music
David Wynne - Sonata No. 1 for keyboard

Film
Edmund Gwenn stars in Miracle on 34th Street.

Broadcasting
Dylan Thomas - The Return Journey

Sport
Cricket - Wilf Wooller is appointed Captain-Secretary of Glamorgan CCC.
Rugby Union
20 December - Wales beat Australia 6–0 at the National Stadium, Cardiff.

Births
2 February - Frank Hennessy, folk singer and radio presenter
5 February - Paul James Wheeler, rugby player
11 February - Douglas Davies, theologian
22 February - Bleddyn Williams, rugby player (died 2009)
12 March - Rod Richards, politician
18 March - Roger Kenneth Evans, politician
27 March - Craig Defoy, golfer
27 April - Pete Ham, musician (died 1975)
16 May - Owen Money, born Lynn Mittell, entertainer
1 June - Jonathan Pryce, born John Price, actor
4 June - Mickey Evans footballer
12 June - Alwyn Pritchard, statistician
12 July - Gareth Edwards, rugby player
17 July(in England) - Camilla, Queen Consort (Princess of Wales, 2005–2022)
2 August - Iolo Ceredig Jones, chess player
30 August - Alwyn Jones, biophysicist
9 September - Clive Shell, rugby player (died 2012)
24 September(in Loughborough) - Mick Bates AM, politician
5 October
Dennis Avoth, heavyweight boxer
Phil Carradice, writer and broadcaster
16 October 
Steve Derrett, footballer
Terry Griffiths, snooker player
29 October - Val Feld, politician (died 2001)
November - Beverley Humphreys, singer and broadcaster
24 November - Paul Griffiths, music critic, fiction writer and librettist
5 December - Don Touhig, politician
Sheila Morrow - president of Great Britain Hockey

Deaths
10 January - Lillie Goodisson, nurse, late 80s 
26 February - Percy Phillips OBE, Wales international rugby player and civil servant
16 March - Jack Powell, footballer, 86
24 March - John Henry Evans, Mormon teacher and writer, 74
26 March - Charles Alexander Harris, governor of Newfoundland, 91
31 March - John Phillips, Dean of Monmouth, 67 and ordained in 1909.
15 May - Arthur Harding, Wales international rugby union captain, 68
23 May - Richard Griffith (Carneddog), poet and journalist, 85
25 May - Samuel Clark, rugby official and international rugby player
20 June - Sir John Edward Lloyd, historian, 86
30 June - Jerry Shea, Welsh rugby union and rugby league player, 54
5 July - Jack Evans, Wales international rugby player, 72
7 July
 James Henry Howard, minister and writer, 70
 Johnny Basham, boxer, 56
23 July - David James Jones, philosopher, 60
10 August - David Evan Jones, missionary, 77
12 October - William Brace, politician, 82
18 October - Alexander Bland, Wales international rugby player, 80
16 November - Thomas Griffiths, Australian Army general, 82
22 November - James J. Davis, United States politician, 74
23 November 
Sir George Lockwood Morris, industrialist and Welsh international rugby player, 88
Matthew W. Davies, musician, 65
12 December - William John Evans, musician and composer, 81
15 December - Arthur Machen, writer, 74
23 December - John Samuel, Wales international rugby player

See also
1947 in Northern Ireland

References

 
Wales